Angelina Ebauyer (born 2 November 2001) is a Kazakhstani female curler and curling coach.

Teams and events

Women's

Mixed

Mixed doubles

Record as a coach of national teams

References

External links
 

 Состав сборной Казахстана по керлингу | Спортивные новости Казахстана и мировые новости спорта
 
 

2001 births
Living people
Kazakhstani female curlers
Kazakhstani curling coaches
21st-century Kazakhstani women